Juniper Island is one of the largest islands located on Lower Stony Lake, a lake situated in Ontario.  It is home to private cottages, the Stony Lake Yacht Club and Juniper Island Store.  The Stony Lake Yacht Club is governed by its Board of Directors.  Its functions include tennis lessons, sailing lessons as well as several social events.  The Stoney Lake Cottagers Association governs the Juniper Island Store, swimming lessons and canoeing lessons as well as weekly square dances.

References

External links

Lake islands of Ontario